The 2023 UCLA Bruins football team will represent the University of California, Los Angeles in the Pac-12 Conference during the 2023 NCAA Division I FBS football season. The Bruins are expected to be led by Chip Kelly in his sixth year as their head coach. They play their home games at the Rose Bowl.

The season marks the team's last season as members of Pac-12 Conference before joining the Big Ten Conference on August 2, 2024.

Offseason
On January 24, 2023, UCLA announced that it was hiring Kodi Whitfield as its new cornerbacks coach. On February 27, the school announced that it was hiring D'Anton Lynn as its defensive coordinator.

Schedule

Game summaries

vs Coastal Carolina

at San Diego State

vs North Carolina Central (FCS)

at Utah

vs Washington State

at Oregon State

at Stanford

vs Colorado

at Arizona

vs Arizona State

at USC (Victory Bell)

vs California

Rankings

Statistics 

Source:

Awards and honors

References

UCLA
UCLA Bruins football seasons
UCLA Bruins football